Nadine Basile (1931–2017) was a French stage, film and television actress.  She was awarded the Prix Suzanne Bianchetti in 1952. She was married to the actor Jean Martinelli.

Selected filmography
 Au royaume des cieux (1949)
 Under the Sky of Paris (1951)
 L'amour, Madame (1952)
 Crazy for Love (1952)
 Stain in the Snow (1954)
 Le feu dans la peau (1954)
 Wild Fruit (1954)
 Mademoiselle from Paris (1955)
 Black Dossier (1955)
 Twelve Hours to Live (1956)
 Ce soir les jupons volent... (1956)
 Sylviane de mes nuits (1957)
 Maigret Sets a Trap (1958)
 The Gendarme of Champignol (1959)
 Un couple (1960)
 Who Are You, Mr. Sorge? (1961)
 Tintin and the Lake of Sharks (1972)
 The Adolescent (1979)

References

Bibliography
 Biggs, Melissa E. French films, 1945-1993: a critical filmography of the 400 most important releases. McFarland & Company, 1996.
 Goble, Alan. The Complete Index to Literary Sources in Film. Walter de Gruyter, 1999.

External links

1931 births
2017 deaths
French film actresses
French television actresses
French stage actresses
People from Paris